Colegio Monteverde may refer to:

 Colegio Monteverde (Chile), Santiago de Chile
 Colegio Monteverde (Mexico), Mexico City
 Centro Educativo Monteverde, Cancun, Mexico